Age of Heroes (Persian: عصر پهلوانان) (previously named Age of Pahlevans or Asre Pahlevanan) is a 2009 Iranian video game. Created by the Modern Industry Center, it was released by Ras Games and the National Foundation for Computer Games with support from the Ferdowsi Foundation.

The plotline of Age of Heroes, derived from Ferdowsi's epic the Shahnameh, centers on the efforts of Atar, son of Pishad and commander of the kingdom of Sistan, to fight against demons which have captured and laid waste to much of the region. The game features 110 mythical figures (including Arash, Siavash, Fereidun, Kaveh, Esfandiar, Rustam, and Zal) living in nine regions (including Sistan, Sarsabz, Kuhestan, and Atashfeshani).

The game was named the best Iranian game by emag, and was positively received as a promoter of Iranian culture and heritage by other critics.
Two Sequels for the game were released .
Undying released in 2010 and Thrateon released in 2018.

See also
 Special Operation 85: Hostage Rescue

References
https://www.escapistmagazine.com/news/view/94060-Iranian-Devs-Seek-Western-Support-at-Gamescom
http://news.bbc.co.uk/2/hi/technology/8213272.stm

2009 video games
Video games based on poems
Video games developed in Iran
Video games set in Iran